Thanduyise Abraham Khuboni (born 22 May 1986 in Clermont, KwaZulu-Natal) is a South African footballer who currently plays for Uthongathi.

Playing career
Khuboni spent his youth career at a number of local amateur clubs before joining Golden Arrows in 2006. He was part of the Arrows team that won the 2009 MTN 8 Cup. Khuboni played in every minute of Arrows' 30 games in the 2011–12 season. In January 2013, Khuboni was linked with a transfer to an unnamed German Bundesliga club as his contract was expiring at the end of the season. Arrows subsequently exercised a 1-year option they had on his contract, thus tying him to the club until the end of the 2013–14 season.

International career
Khuboni made his international debut for South Africa on 27 January 2010 in a 3–0 victory against Zimbabwe in a friendly match played in Durban. He was part of the South African squad for the 2010 FIFA World Cup and played in their final group stage match against France.

References

External links

1986 births
Living people
People from Clermont, KwaZulu-Natal
South African soccer players
Association football midfielders
South Africa international soccer players
Lamontville Golden Arrows F.C. players
Mpumalanga Black Aces F.C. players
Highlands Park F.C. players
Uthongathi F.C. players
South African Premier Division players
National First Division players
2010 FIFA World Cup players
Soccer players from KwaZulu-Natal